The Dwarves Are Born Again is the 2011 release by the American punk rock band Dwarves. It is the band's eighth full-length original album.

Album information
This album marks a return to the standard thrash/punk/noise sound they are known for, greatly more so than in previous Dwarves productions, the original sound of the Dwarves shows clearly in several tracks. This album follows a pop collaboration of Blag Dahlia's called "Candy Now!", as well as  "Sunday School Massacre", a solo album from HeWhoCannotBeNamed. A remake of the song "Happy Suicide" from that album appears on "Born Again" retitled as "Happy Birthday Suicide". Like several previous Dwarves albums, it features the iconic images of the dwarf (Bobby Faust) and naked women attributed to The Dwarves, this time in a pseudo-religious framework.

Some editions of the album came with a 25th Anniversary DVD, which features live footage and the band's music videos.

Track listing

References

Dwarves (band) albums
2011 albums